The Frederick ALPB Team are a professional baseball team planned to begin play in 2023 in Frederick, Maryland. The franchise will compete in the South Division of the Atlantic League of Professional Baseball and play their home games at Nymeo Field at Harry Grove Stadium. They will share the ballpark with the Frederick Keys.

History 
The team's creation was announced in November 2022. The team held a name-the-team contest in January and February 2023. The final team name will be unveiled on June 23. Until then, the team's hats and jerseys will feature question marks in place of a name.

Management 
The team is owned by Attain Sports and Entertainment, which also owns the Bowie Baysox and the Frederick Keys. Attain is led by Greg Baroni, CEO and Managing General Partner, and Richard Roberts, President and General Partner. The team's announced front office staff consists of Chuck Domino, Senior Vice President of Baseball Operations, and Mary Nixon, executive director of Baseball Operations. The team's announced coaching staff consists of manager Mark Minicozzi, hitting coach Aharon Eggleston, and pitching coach Elih Villanueva, who will also pitch for the team as a player-coach.

References

External links
 Atlantic League of Professional Baseball

2023 establishments in Maryland
Baseball teams established in 2023
Atlantic League of Professional Baseball teams
Professional baseball teams in Maryland
Frederick, Maryland